Postmane Kananilla is a 1972 Indian Malayalam-language film, directed by Kunchacko. The film stars Prem Nazir, K. P. Ummer, Vijayasree and KPAC Lalitha. The film's score was composed by G. Devarajan.

Cast

Prem Nazir
K. P. Ummer
Vijayasree
KPAC Lalitha
Adoor Bhasi
Manavalan Joseph
Adoor Pankajam
Alummoodan
Aryad Gopalakrishnan
Baby Indira
Kaduvakulam Antony
Kavitha
N. Govindankutty
Paravoor Bharathan
Philomina
S. P. Pillai
Vijayakala
Vijayanirmala
Jayan  Uncredited role

 D Philip

Soundtrack
The music was composed by G. Devarajan with lyrics by Vayalar Ramavarma.

References

External links
 

1972 films
1970s Malayalam-language films